The Mound Cemetery is a historic cemetery, located just outside Arkansas City, Arkansas in Desha County. The oldest portion of the cemetery, dating to the 1860s, is located on top of a Mississippian culture mound, one of the few places the early American settlers of the area found to be safe from periodic flooding by the Mississippi River.

The mound was probably created sometime between 1200 and 1600 AD.  It was reported in the 19th century that people digging new graves would find artifacts and older human remains.  The oldest dated grave is that of Rachel Horton, who died March 15, 1866.  The cemetery contains 78 historic graves, and continues to be used for burials.

The cemetery was listed on the National Register of Historic Places in 2008.

See also
 National Register of Historic Places listings in Desha County, Arkansas

References

External links
 

Cemeteries on the National Register of Historic Places in Arkansas
Buildings and structures completed in 1866
Buildings and structures in Desha County, Arkansas
Geography of Desha County, Arkansas
1866 establishments in Arkansas
National Register of Historic Places in Desha County, Arkansas
Cemeteries established in the 1860s